Pant (Sanskrit: पंत) or Panta is a last name, commonly found in Nepal and in the Indian states of Uttarakhand and Maharashtra. It is a traditional surname used by Brahmins, a priestly community. Foremostly involved in the activities of the state, they were generally found involved in activities such as academics, religion, management, politics and warfare.

In India 
Pant was used as a last name, suffix or title commonly by priests, as well as the officers, commanders, ministers and leaders of high influence in the affairs of the state. In Uttarakhand, many Brahmin communities use this as surname. In Maharashtra, Brahmin groups who have used the term as part of their names usually belong to either of the 3 Brahminical groups such as Deshastha, Chitpavan and Karhade.

In Nepal 
Pant people are also found in good numbers in Nepal. They are ethnically same as the Pant people of Uttarakhand. Usually being amongst the chief-office bearers in the kings courts along with the majority Pande rank holders, they were foremostly involved in affairs that concerned with education (also medicine), administration and warfare.

Notable people

 Aditi Pant First Indian Lady to visit Antarctica
 Aditya Bhushan Pant, Indian toxicologist, neurobiologist and a scientist
 Anju Panta, Nepalese Pop and Folk Singer
 Apa Pant, Indian diplomat and freedom fighter
 Bahiroji Pingale (1708–1711) – the fourth Peshwa of the Maratha Empire and the younger son of Moropant Trimbak Pingle
 Chandra Pant, Nepalese film director and stunt performer
 Dasopant (1551–1615) – Marathi poet-saint and prolific writer of Varkari sect.; also known as Daso Digambar
 Diksha Panth, Indian actress
 Garima Panta, Nepalese Actress
 Govind Ballabh Pant, the first Chief Minister of Uttar Pradesh
 Govind Ballal Kher (Govind Pant Bundela) (1710–1760), general and trustee of Peshwa Bajirao I 's territories in Bundelkhand
 Hargovind Pant Indian Freedom Fighter
Hari Pant General of the Maratha Empire 
Hemad Pant, Prime Minister of Seuna (Yadava) dynasty
 Ila Pant, Indian politician
 Jayatirtha (Dhondopant Raghunath Deshpande) (1345–1388) – a Hindu philosopher, dialectician, and polemicist
 K. C. Pant, former Indian Member of Parliament 
 Kamla Pant, Women Activist, part of Uttarakhand Mahila Manch, played a prominent role in the creation of Uttarakhand state
 Maheshwar Panta (18th century), Army General of Gorkha Kingdom and Guru of King Prithvi Narayan Shah
 Manoj Pant Director, Indian Institute of Foreign Trade 
 M. C. Pant, Indian radiation oncologist and Padma Shri recipient 
 Meghna Pant, fiction author and financial journalist 
 Moropant Ramachandra Paradkar (1729–1794), Marathi poet who was the last among those classified by Marathi literary scholars as pandit  poets.
 Moropant Trimbak Pingle (1657–1683) – the first Peshwa in Shivaji Maharaj's Asthapradhan Mandal 
 Muktesh Pant, Indian–born businessman
 Naya Raj Pant (1913–2002), Nepalese historian, astronomer, poet  
 Nilakanth Moreshvar Pingale (1683–1689) – the second Peshwa of the Maratha Empire and elder son of Moropant Trimbak Pingle  
 Parshuram Pant Pratinidhi and his descendants were the hereditary Pratinidhi's of the Maratha Empire and also the rulers of Aundh and Vishalgad  
 Pitambar Pant, Indian independence activist, civil service officer and writer
 Prafulla Chandra Pant, former judge Supreme Court of India.
 Prakash Pant, Uttarakhand Politician
 Pushpesh Pant, academic, food critic and historian 
 Raghuji Pant, CPN-UML politician
 Ram Raj Pant, Linguist of the Nepali language, literary writer and promoter of legal education in Nepal
 Ramchandra Pant Amatya (1689–1708) – Amatya, Peshwa and Hukumat Panah of the Maratha Empire during the reign of Shivaji and Rajaram I
 Ranjan Pant, CEO Advisor and Global Strategy Management Consultant 
 Rishabh Pant, Indian cricketer
 Samarth Ramdas (Narayan Suryajipant Thosar) (1608–1681) – Hindu Vaishnava saint from Maharashtra
 Santosh Panta, Nepalese actor, comedian, screenwriter, and director
 Sheila Irene Pant, 10th Governor of Sindh, wife of the first Prime Minister of Pakistan, Liaquat Ali Khan.
 Shivani, Gaura Pant, story writer for women's magazines
 Sorabh Pant Indian standup comic and writer
 Sumitranandan Pant, poet and philosopher
 Sunil Babu Pant, LGBT social activist In Nepal
 Surakshya Panta, Nepalese actress
 Yadav Pant, Nepalese economist, politician and former Governor (Fifth) of Nepal Rastra Bank

References

Indian surnames
Nepali-language surnames
Khas surnames